KNVV-LP, UHF analog channel 41, was a low-powered UniMás-affiliated television station licensed to Reno, Nevada, United States. Owned by Entravision Communications, it was a sister station to Univision affiliate KREN-TV (channel 27) and low-power CW affiliate KRNS-CD (channel 46). Due to its low-power status, KNVV did not have a digital signal of its own. However, there was a standard-definition digital signal on KREN-TV's third digital subchannel (UHF channel 26.3 or virtual channel 27.3 via PSIP) to serve as that purpose. The station also held a construction permit to move to digital channel 36 as KNVV-LD.

At one point it was simulcast on KNCV-LP (channel 48) in Carson City, Nevada. However, on August 17, 2010, the Federal Communications Commission (FCC) canceled that station's license and deleted the KNCV-LP call sign from its database.

History

KNVV became the local affiliate of Univision in 2002, replacing KUVR-LP (channel 68, now KRNS-CD). The station was not available on either DirecTV or Dish Network for local viewers on those satellite services.

In September 2008, KREN-TV, then owned by Pappas Telecasting Companies, was placed under contract to Entravision (along with what was then KAZR-CA) for $4 million. No bidders were found for either property, and Entravision officially became the owner of both stations on April 1, 2009. At some point between September and April, Entravision moved KNVV's Univision affiliation to the main channel of the full-power KREN signal (which previously carried The CW, which then moved to KRNS-CA/KREN-DT2). At that time, KNVV switched to TeleFutura.

On August 15, 2011, Entravision turned off the analog channel 41 transmitter so that it could flash-cut to digital. However, due to delays in the construction of the digital replacement station, Entravision turned the channel 41 analog transmitter back on on August 14, 2012, one day before the FCC would have deemed the KNVV-LP license to have been automatically expired (low-power stations operating on an in-core frequency have until 2015 to convert to digital). The station remained available on KREN's third digital subchannel.

The station's license was canceled by the FCC on May 23, 2014.

NVV-LP
Spanish-language television stations in Nevada
Television channels and stations established in 2000
2000 establishments in Nevada
Television channels and stations disestablished in 2014
2014 disestablishments in Nevada
Defunct television stations in the United States
Entravision Communications stations
NVV-LP